Anas Sameer N.H. Abu-Yousuf (born November 16, 1989) was a Qatari swimmer, who specialized in freestyle events. Abu-Yousuf was one of the youngest swimmers (aged 14) to compete at the 2004 Summer Olympics in Athens. He qualified for the men's 400 m freestyle by receiving a Universality place from FINA, in an entry time of 4:18.70. Swimming in heat one, he posted a lifetime best of 4:11.99 to pull off a fourth-place effort by exactly 10 seconds behind winner Miguel Molina of the Philippines. Abu-Yousuf failed to reach the top 8 final, as he placed forty-third overall on the first day of preliminaries.

References

1989 births
Living people
Olympic swimmers of Qatar
Swimmers at the 2004 Summer Olympics
Swimmers at the 2002 Asian Games
Swimmers at the 2006 Asian Games
Qatari male freestyle swimmers
Asian Games competitors for Qatar